Croisances (Auvergnat: Crosanças) is a former commune in the Haute-Loire department in south-central France.

History 
On 1 January 2016, Croisances was annexed by the commune of Thoras.

See also
Communes of the Haute-Loire department

References

Former communes of Haute-Loire
Populated places disestablished in 2016